The spiny river snail, scientific name Io fluvialis, is a species of freshwater snail, an aquatic mollusk in the family Pleuroceridae. This is the only species in the genus Io. This species is endemic to the USA.

Ecology

Distribution
This species is endemic to the Tennessee River and its larger tributaries, but it has been largely extirpated due to pollution and the construction of dams.

Habitat
These snails live in rapidly flowing, well-oxygenated waters of shoals and riffles of rivers, but not in slack water below shoals. The preferred water depth for this species is up to 1.5 m.

Behavior
These snails feed on the algal coating on rocks.  Females lay between 20-100 eggs, which begin to hatch after 15 days.

Description
The shell morphology is very variable, with some individuals totally lacking spines.  For this reason it was formerly thought that many species existed within this genus.

Human relevance
The shells are found abundantly in shell middens along the rivers within its range, indicating they were exploited as a food source by Native American cultures. Additionally, this snail has served as the emblem for the American Malacological Society since 1960.

References

Molluscs of the United States
Pleuroceridae
Gastropods described in 1825
Taxonomy articles created by Polbot